North Dakota Highway 36 (ND 36) is a  east–west state highway in the U.S. state of North Dakota. ND 36's western terminus is at U.S. Route 83 (US 83) south of Wilton, and the eastern terminus is a US 52 in Pingree.

Major Intersections

References

036
Transportation in Burleigh County, North Dakota
Transportation in Kidder County, North Dakota
Transportation in Stutsman County, North Dakota